Āmuktamālyada is a Telugu epic poem composed by Krishnadevaraya, the Vijayanagara Emperor in the early 16th century. Amuktamalyada translates to "One who offered the garland after wearing it himself". Considered as a masterpiece, Amuktamalyada describes the story of wedding of the Hindu Lord Ranganayaka, an avatar, of Vishnu and Goda Devi aka Andal the Tamil Alvar poet and daughter of Periyalvar, at Srirangam.

Krishnadevaraya

Krishnadevaraya was the king of the Vijayanagara Empire reigning between 1509–1530. He was the third ruler of the Tuluva Dynasty, and presided over the Vijayanagara empire at its zenith. Krishna Deva Raya earned the titles of Kannada Rajya Rama Ramana (lit, "Lord of the Kannada empire"), Andhra Bhoja and Mooru Rayara Ganda (lit, "King of three Kings"). He became the dominant ruler of the peninsula of India by defeating the Sultans of Bijapur, Golconda, the Bahmani Sultanate and the Gajapati Kingdom of Orissa.

Krishnadevaraya during his reign patronised many Kannada, Telugu and Sanskrit poets. His court had 8 Telugu poets (Astadiggajalu) - Allasani Peddana, Nandi Thimmana, Madayyagari Mallana, Dhurjati, Ayyala-raju Rama-Bhadrudu, Pingali Surana, Ramaraja Bhushanudu and Tenali Rama Krishna. The Kannada poets Mallanarya who wrote Bhava-chinta-ratna and Satyendra Chola-kathe and Chatu Vittal-anatha who wrote Bhagavata also enjoyed his patronage. The Tamil poet Haridasa and Tamil literature were patronised by Krishnadevaraya. The Sanskrit poet Vyasatirtha who wrote Bhedo-jjivana, Tat-parya-chandrika, Nyaya-mrita (a work directed against Advaita philosophy) and Tarka-tandava enjoyed his patronage. Krishnadevaraya was himself an accomplished Sanskrit scholar and wrote Madalasa Charita, Satyavadu Parinaya and Rasamanjari and Jambavati Kalyana

Andal

Andal is the only female among the 12 Vaishnava Tamil saints - the Alvars.  According to tradition, Andal was born in Srivilliputtur. She was found  as an infant, abandoned under a basil (Tulasi - Ocimum tenuiflorum) tree, by Vishnucitta (or Periyalvar) who himself was an Alvar poet. It is said that Periyalvar recocognised the child as Bhudevi, the consort of Lord Vishnu (p. 36). Active in the 7th-century, Andal is credited with the Tamil works, Thiruppavai and Nachiar Tirumozhi, which are still recited by devotees during the winter festival season of Margazhi. Andal is known for her unwavering devotion to Lord Vishnu, the God of the Srivaishnavas. The Srivilliputhur Temple in Tamil Nadu is dedicated to her, marking her birthplace.

Some of Andal's verses express love for Lord Vishnu, written with bold sensuality and startlingly savage longing, hunger and inquiry, that even today many of her most erotic poems are rarely rendered publicly.

Krishnadevaraya's Amuktamalyada
It is believed that Krishnadevaraya wrote the work, after getting a dream in the portico of the Srikakula Andhra Maha Vishnu temple, in the Srikakulam Village (today's Krishna District) on the banks of river Krishna, in which Lord Andhra Maha Vishnu appeared and instructed him to write the story of his wedding to Andal at Srirangam in Telugu.
In his dream, on being asked why Telugu was chosen, Lord Vishnu is said to have replied

Which translates to: "If you ask, 'Why Telugu?' It is because this is Telugu country and I am a Telugu king. Telugu is sweet. After speaking with all the kings that serve you, didn’t you realize - amongst all the languages in the country, Telugu is the best!".

Amuktamalyada describes pain of separation (viraha) experienced by Andal, who is described as the incarnate of Lakshmi the consort of Vishnu. Further the poem describes Andal's beauty in 30 verses written in the keśādi-pādam style, starting from her hair, going down her body till her feet.

References

https://play.google.com/store/books/details/Vyankatesh_Devanpalli_Aamuktamalyada_Srikrishnadev?id=gR9FDwAAQBAJ

Art and culture of Vijayanagar Empire
Indian literature
Telugu-language literature
Medieval Indian literature
Alvars